Sudbury Downs was a harness racing track located in Greater Sudbury, Ontario, Canada, on Bonin Road between the communities of Azilda and Chelmsford. Sudbury Downs held its last day of live racing on October 30, 2013.

The site is now home to Gateway Casinos Sudbury.

Location history
Sudbury Downs was built on the farm of Médéric Bonin, which was settled in the mid 19th century by the Bonin family.  The track is located in Boninville, which has now been amalgamated with Greater Sudbury.  The history of this location can still be seen in places around Sudbury Downs.  The land and its surrounding was transformed from a dense, Northern Ontario hardwood forest into farmland for much of the 19th century.

External links
 Sudbury Downs

Sports venues in Greater Sudbury
Horse racing venues in Ontario
Casinos in Ontario